Black Tiger, known in Japan as , is a hack-and-slash platform game released for arcades by Capcom in 1987.

Plot
The land is under the cruel control of three evil demonic dragons, who descended on a kingdom to bring darkness and destruction. From the ruins emerged a barbarian hero, who seeks to slay the dragons and restore the kingdom to its former glory.

Gameplay

The game is presented in a side-scrolling format, with eight-way scrolling (like Bionic Commando). The player controls the barbarian hero to navigate through eight levels infested with enemies and destroying the levels bosses. The player can find a number of "wise men" who give rewards when rescued. Though the wise man rewards often consist of self-evident "advice", most come in the form of "Zenny coins", currency that allows the player to buy various items, such as an upgrade to their weapons and armour, keys for treasure chests, and anti-poisoning potions. Hidden special items that reveal coins, grant upgraded armour, full vitality, extra lives, extra time, or simply bonus points may be found by attacking certain walls. The player's vitality bar will also increase up to four times as a reward for reaching score benchmarks. The player can also find hidden dungeons in the level for extra points and items.

The Japanese version has a few changes that makes it more challenging than its American counterpart:
 Several of the "falling rock" obstacles are added
 The prices of many items are higher
 More points are needed to increase maximum vitality
 It is not possible to avoid taking damage from bosses by crouching under them

Development
Black Tiger was planned for released around October 1986, but programming placement difficulties delayed it. During conversion, the game was one of ten games included in a $2,000,000 deal between U.S. Gold and some Japanese coin-op specialists.

Ports
 Europe-based U.S. Gold released versions of Black Tiger for Amstrad CPC, Amiga, Atari ST, and ZX Spectrum in 1989. A version for the Commodore 64 was released in 1990, developed by Softworx.
 An emulation of the arcade game is included in the compilations Capcom Classics Collection: Remixed for PlayStation Portable and Capcom Classics Collection Vol. 2 for PlayStation 2 and Xbox.
 The arcade version of Black Tiger was released on the Wii's Virtual Console in Japan on December 7, 2010, the PAL region on January 21, 2011, and in North America on January 24.
 The game is included as the initial game in Capcom Arcade Cabinet for PlayStation Network and Xbox Live Arcade on February 19, 2013.
 SonSon II for the PC Engine was a game heavily based on Black Tiger, but targeted at a younger audience.
 The game is one of 32 available in Capcom Arcade 2nd Stadium that was released on July 22, 2022.

Reception

In Japan, Game Machine listed the game on their October 15, 1987 issue as being the sixth most-successful table arcade unit of the month. 

Black Tiger received a number of positive reviews. Computer and Video Games put the Atari ST, Amiga and Commodore 64 ports as among the top 20 games of the respective computers of 1990.

See also
Magic Sword (video game)

References

External links

1987 video games
Amiga games
Amstrad CPC games
Arcade video games
Atari ST games
Cancelled Nintendo Entertainment System games
Capcom games
Commodore 64 games
Hack and slash games
Platform games
PlayStation 3 games
PlayStation Network games
Romstar games
U.S. Gold games
Video games developed in Japan
Virtual Console games
Xbox 360 Live Arcade games
ZX Spectrum games
Multiplayer and single-player video games
Video games scored by Tamayo Kawamoto